Anthony Wonke is a film director. He is an Emmy and triple BAFTA winning director and an Oscar nominated and Emmy winning executive producer. He has also won, amongst other awards, the Prix Italia, Peabody, Grierson and RTS for his films. Wonke is known for his original feature documentaries Ronaldo, Being AP, Fire in the Night and The Battle for Marjah as well as his documentary series The Tower: A Tale of Two Cities. Wonke's work ranges across a variety of genres always highlighted by intelligence, visual flair and emotional insight. His work has been shown at film festivals in the US, Canada, the Far East and the UK, as well as being televised on BBC 1, BBC 2, Channel 4 and HBO.

Career
In 2008, he was granted exclusive access to the female British Olympic Gymnastics squad, showing the hopes, joys and disappointments behind the Olympic dream. The resulting 90-minute documentary, Gymnast, was broadcast on BBC2 in June 2012.

In 2008, he won the BAFTA Factual Series Award for his epic 8 x 50-minute BBC 1 documentary series The Tower: A Tale of Two Cities. He directed and series-produced this over three years, charting the extremes of contemporary society by focusing on a tower block within one of the poorest council estates in London which was being sold as luxury flats. The series was also nominated for a Grierson and Broadcast Award, and won the RTS Award for Factual Editing.

Subsequently, Wonke series produced and directed The £800M Railway Station, a 6 x 30-minute series for BBC 2. Nominated for a Broadcasting Press Guild Award, the series explores the passion, sacrifice and politics behind the renovation of St Pancras International.

In 2012, The Battle for Marjah, the 90-minute feature documentary Wonke made with Ben Anderson about a platoon of marines in Afghanistan with Wall to Wall Media for HBO/Channel 4, was nominated for three Emmy awards and won the History Makers Award for Best Current Affairs. Also in 2012, Crack House USA, a 90-minute film he directed for MSNBC/More 4 about a drugs gang in Chicago brought down by a federal wire tap, was nominated for the BAFTA Factual Photography Award.

In 2013, Fire in the Night, a theatrical documentary about the Piper Alpha disaster produced by STV for Creative Scotland/BBC, had its world premiere at the Edinburgh International Film Festival and won the festival's Audience Award. It was also nominated for three Scottish BAFTAs including the Audience Film Award and best Feature Film and won best Single documentary. It was released in UK cinemas before its TV premiere on BBC2 to coincide with the 25th anniversary of the disaster.

In 2014, Wonke produced Children on the Front Line, a disturbing but poignant film for Channel 4 and Arte, about children living in the midst of the fighting in Syria, demonstrating the humanity of those at the heart of the conflict. Wonke and the co-director Marcel Mettelsiefen have received 16 awards for this film including an Emmy, two BAFTAs, the Prix Italia, Peabody, RTS, Grierson and One World.

In 2015, he released the theatrical features Ronaldo with Universal Pictures and Being AP with BBC Films. Ronaldo is an intimate and definitive portrait of Cristiano Ronaldo, voted the world's best football player. It was produced by the makers of Senna and Amy. Being AP is the extraordinary story of A P McCoy, who through obsessive dedication to his sport and heroic disregard of injuries, has become the most successful jump jockey of all time, as he starts to contemplate retirement.  Being AP received its world premiere at the Toronto International Film Festival.

In 2016, Wonke was the executive producer on the Oscar nominated short Watani: My Homeland. The 40-minute documentary follows the story of a family's escape from the Syrian Civil War and their attempt to start a new life in Germany.

Wonke's project The Director and The Jedi is a feature documentary following the director Rian Johnson and his experience of directing the latest Star Wars film. It had its world premiere at SXSW in March 2018.

His feature documentary about the global ISIS terrorist Jihadi John for HBO premiered in summer 2019. 

In later years, Wonke has added commercials to his directing portfolio and the results have been highly acclaimed. He has worked for Ogilvy Mather, New York, Saatchi and JWT on the BP, Lurpak and Mazda 3 campaigns respectively. His innovative direction of the Ogilvy Mather Du Pont Horizons campaign has been rewarded with awards at the BRAVES, the Stevies, the Internet Advertising Awards, the One Show Pencils and a place on the shortlist at Cannes Lion Awards. His Brooklyn Brothers/We Are Social Jaguar "Your Turn Britain" campaign won a Campaign Award and two Chartered Institute of Marketing Awards while his Partizan/Rainey Kelly Campbell Roalfe/Y&R "Vodafone Real Families" campaign won a British Arrows Craft Award in 2014.

Wonke is represented for film and television by Casarotto Ramsay and Associates and by Partizan for commercials.

Personal life

Wonke is married with two daughters and lives in North London.

Filmography
Executive producer 

Director

Awards and honours

Awards 
 2008 British Academy Television Award, British Academy Television Award for Best Factual Series: The Tower: A Tale of Two Cities
 2008 RTS Award, Factual Editing: The Tower: A Tale of Two Cities
 2012 History Makers Award, Best Current Affairs: The Battle for Marjah
 2013 Edinburgh International Film Festival, Audience Award: Fire in the Night
 2013 British Academy Scotland Awards, Best Single Documentary: Fire in the Night

References

External links 
 Casarotto Ramsay and Associates
 Anthony Wonke's page at IMDb

BAFTA winners (people)
Living people
Year of birth missing (living people)
British television directors
British documentary film directors